The 1921 Ice Hockey European Championship was the sixth edition of the ice hockey tournament for European countries associated to the International Ice Hockey Federation .  
 
The tournament was played on February 23, 1921, at Stockholm, Sweden, and it was won by Sweden.

Results

February 18

Final standings

Top Goalscorers

Erik Burman (Sweden), 3 goals
Georg Johansson-Brandius (Sweden), 3 goals

References
 Euro Championship 1921

     
1921
Ice Hockey European Championships
1920s in Stockholm
February 1921 sports events
International sports competitions in Stockholm